Cláudio Mejolaro (born 8 January 1982 in Porto Alegre, Rio Grande do Sul), commonly known as Pitbull, is a Brazilian professional footballer who plays as a forward for Associação Desportiva Cabofriense.

Football career
After fine displays at Grêmio Foot-Ball Porto Alegrense, Pitbull was acquired by Portugal's FC Porto in the January 2005 transfer window. Unable to settle with the club, he was loaned several times for the duration of his contract, mainly in that country.

On 4 February 2007, Pitbull played his first Primeira Liga match with Académica de Coimbra, against Associação Naval 1º de Maio. For the 2007–08 season he was loaned again, this time to Vitória de Setúbal, where he was the team's top scorer as they overachieved despite facing serious financial problems; in March 2008, he helped the Sadinos to win the newly created League Cup in a penalty shootout against Sporting Clube de Portugal, also being named the tournament's best player.

In July 2008, alongside teammate João Paulo Andrade, Pitbull was loaned to Romanian side FC Rapid București, on a season-long move. After that sole Liga I campaign he returned to Portugal, being loaned for the seventh time by Porto, to C.S. Marítimo.

Pitbull returned to Setúbal for a second spell in 2010–11, scoring nine goals in 26 games to help the team again avoid relegation. In late January 2012 he switched clubs and countries again, joining Manisaspor in the Turkish Süper Lig.

Honours
Grêmio
Copa do Brasil: 2001

Setúbal
Taça da Liga: 2007–08

References

External links

1982 births
Living people
Brazilian footballers
Association football forwards
Campeonato Brasileiro Série A players
Grêmio Foot-Ball Porto Alegrense players
Esporte Clube Juventude players
Santos FC players
Fluminense FC players
Esporte Clube Bahia players
Associação Desportiva Cabofriense players
Primeira Liga players
FC Porto players
Associação Académica de Coimbra – O.A.F. players
Vitória F.C. players
C.S. Marítimo players
Gil Vicente F.C. players
Saudi Professional League players
Ittihad FC players
Liga I players
FC Rapid București players
Süper Lig players
Manisaspor footballers
Brazilian expatriate footballers
Expatriate footballers in Portugal
Expatriate footballers in Saudi Arabia
Expatriate footballers in Romania
Expatriate footballers in Turkey
Brazilian expatriate sportspeople in Portugal
Footballers from Porto Alegre